Skeletocutis pseudo-odora is a species of poroid crust fungus in the family Polyporaceae. It was described as a new species by Chinese mycologists in 2017. The type specimen was collected from Leigongshan Nature Reserve in Leishan County, Guizhou Province. The fungus is named after its similarity to Skeletocutis odora.

References

Fungi described in 2017
Fungi of China
pseudo-odora